The Watch Tower is a tower on Manor Street in Waterford, Munster, Ireland. It is one of the six surviving towers of the city walls of Waterford. The cylindrical shape of the tower suggests that it was built in the 13th century. The arrow slit openings, or embrasures, with a gun loop at the bottom indicate that the tower was modified in the 15th or 16th century to facilitate artillery operations. The tower does not have any windows on the city side; it was built solely as a defensive structure without a secondary use as a dwelling. At the rear of the tower there are two entrances, one at ground level and another at wall-walk level.

The Close Gate once stood on the western side of the tower, where the road now runs. It was demolished in the eighteenth century by Bullocks Wyse of the Manor of St. John to facilitate easier access to his estate.

The other surviving towers are the Reginald's Tower, Double Tower, French Tower, Semi-Lunar Tower and Beach Tower

See also 

 List of National Monuments in County Waterford
 History of Waterford

References

External links 
 Official website
 City walls map
 National Monuments in State Care - Waterford

Buildings and structures in the Republic of Ireland
Towers in the Republic of Ireland